Brandon Nima is a Papua New Guinea international rugby league footballer who plays as a  for the Papua New Guinea Hunters in the Queensland Cup. He was the vice captain for the PNG Hunters team for the 2022 season. His wife, Belinda Gwasamun plays 

Career
Nima made his international debut for Papua New Guinea as 18th man in their 24-6 defeat by Samoa in the 2019 Oceania Cup.

References

External links
PNG Hunters profile
PNG Kumuls profile

Living people
Papua New Guinean rugby league players
Papua New Guinea national rugby league team players
Papua New Guinea Hunters players
Rugby league centres
1995 births